Graptacme is a genus of molluscs belonging to the family Dentaliidae.

The genus has almost cosmopolitan distribution.

Species

Species:

Graptacme acutissima 
Graptacme acutistriata 
Graptacme africana

References

Molluscs